The Rapid Intervention Force (FNSH) is the reserve force of the Albanian State Police which is tasked to carry out special security operations and resolve situations that can not be overcome by other police services, the execution of which requires specially prepared and equipped personnel. FNSH offers assistance in cases of civil emergencies and accidents for the protection of life and property.

See also
Albanian Police
RENEA

References

Law enforcement in Albania
1992 establishments in Albania